Holzmann is a German surname. Notable people with the surname include:

Abe Holzmann (1874–1939), German/American composer, who is most famous today for his march Blaze-Away
Gerard J. Holzmann (born 1951), American computer scientist, best known as the developer of the SPIN model checker
Felix Holzmann (1921–2002), Czech comedian
Johannes Holzmann (1882–1914), German anarchist
Marcel Holzmann (born 1990), Austrian footballer who plays for FC Lustenau
Olly Holzmann (1915–1995), Austrian actress
Thomas Holzmann (born 1987), German professional ice hockey forward

See also
Philipp Holzmann, German construction company based in Frankfurt am Main
Holzman

German-language surnames